Snapfinger is an unincorporated community in DeKalb County, Georgia, United States.

History
A post office called Snapfinger was established in 1881, and remained in operation until 1901. The community takes its name from nearby Snapfinger Creek.

References

Unincorporated communities in the Atlanta metropolitan area
Unincorporated communities in DeKalb County, Georgia
Unincorporated communities in Georgia (U.S. state)